Minerva was launched in 1813 at Aberdeen. She traded across the Atlantic. She was wrecked in the St Lawrence on 13 May 1820.

Career
Minerva first appeared in Lloyd's Register (LR), in 1813.

On 4 March 1818 a gale on the coast of England drove a number of vessels on shore. Minerva, Strachan, master, was driven on shore back of the West Pier Head at Ramsgate. She was on her way from London to Demerara. She was gotten off and taken into port on 8 March. On 28 April she sailed from Ramsgate for Demerara

Fate
On 14 May Captain Morgan, of the brig Minerva, from Liverpool, arrived at Quebec City with her crew in her boats. Captain Morgan, the pilot and the crew took to her boats and headed for the shore. They watched her fill with water and sink  at about 11pm.

Citations

1813 ships
Ships built in Aberdeen
Age of Sail merchant ships of England
Maritime incidents in May 1820